This is a list of the National Register of Historic Places listings in Wilson County, Texas.

This is intended to be a complete list of properties listed on the National Register of Historic Places in Wilson County, Texas. 
There are four properties listed on the National Register in the county. One property is a World Heritage Site, another is a State Antiquities Landmark and includes a Recorded Texas Historic Landmark, and two more are also Recorded Texas Historic Landmarks.

Current listings

The locations of National Register properties may be seen in a mapping service provided.

|}

See also

National Register of Historic Places listings in Texas
Recorded Texas Historic Landmarks in Wilson County

References

External links

Wilson County, Texas
Wilson County
Buildings and structures in Wilson County, Texas